Naldo may refer to:

Ronaldo Aparecido Rodrigues (born 1982), Brazilian football defender
Edinaldo Gomes Pereira (born 1988), Brazilian football defender
Marinaldo dos Santos Oliveira (born 1990), commonly known as Naldo, Brazilian footballer
Ednaldo da Conceição (born 1976), Brazilian football striker
Naldo (producer), reggaeton producer
, Brazilian recording artist
Naldo Kwasie  (born 1986), Suriname footballer
Pastor Maldonado, Venezuelan racecar driver